A talwar also transliterated as Talwaar and Tulwar is a type of South Asian sword.

Talwar may also refer to:

Talwar (surname), a Punjabi surname from India and Pakistan. 
Talwar Gallery, an art gallery in New York, featuring works by artists out of India and Pakistan
Talwar Zani, or Tatbeer an act of self-flagellation by Shiite Muslims
HMIS Talwar, a ship of the Royal Indian Navy and aboard which the Royal Indian Navy mutiny began in 1946 
Talwar class frigate, an Indian Navy frigate class
Talvar (film), a 2015 film

See also 
 
 Talvar